Shyama Zutshi  (1919 – 1953) was a Bollywood actress who was  the first Kashmiri  Girl who joined films in 1934. She was born in 1910 at the Anand Bhavan in Allahabad .

Early life
Shyama Zutshi was born on 8 February 1910 in Allahabad. She was the daughter of Barrister Pandit Ladli Prasad  Zutshi who is the only son of Patrani (Sister of Motilal Nehru). She was admitted to Sacred Heart Convent, Lahore by her mother lado rani. She was fluent in English, Gujarati, Marathi, Urdu, Kashmiri and Hindi. She was also proficient in horse Riding, singing and dancing.

Career and personal life
After passing her BA examination Shyama Zutshi joined Hindi Cinema. Her first movie was Shiv Bhakti which release in the year 1934. She later acted in many films like Majnu (1935), Khooni Jadugar(1939) etc. Her major hit was Karwan-E-Hayat ( 1935 ) in which she acted with K. L. Saigal , T. R. Rajakumari , Pahari Sanyal, Rattan Bai. 
She was became a very successful actress in some days. But with the influence from her elder sister Manmohini she moved out from films and focused on Politics and freedom struggle. Another reason for Shyama Zutshi  to quit films was the advice from a fellow Kashmiri Actor Chander Mohan Wattal who was a close friend of Zutshi family . According to Chander acting in films was not meant for girls from good families like Kashmiri Pandits. So Chander Mohan Wattal always opposed the entry of Kashmiri girls to films. Later Shyama became a Women Congress leader and a Front line freedom fighter ( Non-violence) influenced by Gandhiji's Non Violent struggle along with her mother and three sisters (Chandra Kumari , Manmohini and Janak) . After some time Lado Rani arrange the marriage of Shyama in a well off  Chopra family. She became Shyama Chopra after marriage.

References

External links
 

Indian film actresses
1910 births
1953 deaths